Leffert Lefferts Buck (February 5, 1837 – July 7, 1909) was an American civil engineer and a pioneer in the use of steel arch bridge structures.

Career
Leffert graduated from St. Lawrence University in 1863.  After his graduation from St. Lawrence, Buck enlisted and fought for the Union Army in the American Civil War under General Slocum, participating in the battles at Antietam, Chancellorsville, Gettysburg, Lookout Mountain, Missionary Ridge, Peachtree Creek, Resaca and Ringgold Gap.

Following the completion of the Civil War, Buck earned his civil engineering degree from Rensselaer Polytechnic Institute in Troy, New York, in 1868.  He was associated with Richard Buck, also a prominent bridge engineer.

Some of his projects include:

 The Verrugas Viaduct on the Oroya Railroad in Peru (in the early 1870s)
 The Whirlpool Rapids Bridge over the Niagara Gorge.

 The Williamsburg Bridge, one of New York City's most notable landmarks, with Henry Hornbostel. At 1,600 feet it was the longest bridge in the world when completed in 1903 and a key factor in opening Brooklyn up as a working-class neighborhood for Manhattan. The bridge is well known for its vast reach and massive symmetry.

 The Pont De Rennes bridge (former Platt Street bridge) that spans the Genesee River in Rochester at the High Falls.
 Engineered the Queensboro Bridge in New York City.

Buck served as president of the American Society of Civil Engineers.

Buck died on July 7, 1909 in Hastings, New York. His widow, Mira Gould Buck, died in Eastview, New York in 1946 at the age of 84.

Legacy
A dormitory in the Quadrangle complex at Rensselaer is named after him.

References

External links
RPI: Alumni Hall of Fame: Leffert L. Buck
L.L. Buck Study Page

1837 births
1909 deaths
American civil engineers
Bridge engineers
Rensselaer Polytechnic Institute alumni